Dr Rosie Llewellyn-Jones MBE is a well-known British scholar with an expertise on Lucknow and its culture. Based in London, where she works for the Royal Society for Asian Affairs, Llewellyn-Jones is a regular visitor to Lucknow and has authored several books on the city.

Her partner for many years was Lt. General Stanley Menezes of the Indian Army (1942–1980).

She was appointed Member of the Order of the British Empire (MBE) in the 2015 New Year Honours for services to the British Association for Cemeteries in South Asia and to British Indian studies.

References

British historians
Living people
Year of birth missing (living people)
Members of the Order of the British Empire